
Gmina Zabór is a rural gmina (administrative district) in Zielona Góra County, Lubusz Voivodeship, in western Poland.

Villages
Gmina Zabór contains the villages and settlements of Czarna, Dąbrowa, Droszków, Łaz, Mielno, Milsko, Proczki, Przytoczki, Przytok, Rajewo, Tarnawa, Wielobłota and Zabór.

Neighbouring gminas
Gmina Zabór is bordered by the gminas of Bojadła, Otyń, Sulechów, Trzebiechów and Zielona Góra.

Twin towns – sister cities

Gmina Zabór is twinned with:
 Amt Barnim-Oderbruch, Germany

References

Zabor
Zielona Góra County